Wilfried Rother (born 20 September 1990) is a French footballer who plays as a defender for Championnat National 3 club ES Thaon.

Career
Rother started his career with Troyes in 2009. He signed a professional contract in 2011, and made his professional debut on 18 January 2012, in a 3–2 Ligue 2 away victory at Angers. Rother was loaned to Épinal for the 2012–13 season. At the end of his contract he left Troyes and joined fellow Ligue 2 club Istres on a free transfer for the 2014–15 season.

Rother signed amateur terms with Raon-l'Étape in July 2015, when it was confirmed that Istres would be administratively relegated to level seven of the French football league system for financial issues.

References

External links
Wilfried Rother profile at foot-national.com

1990 births
Living people
People from Coulommiers
Footballers from Seine-et-Marne
French footballers
Association football defenders
ES Troyes AC players
SAS Épinal players
FC Istres players
US Raon-l'Étape players
ES Thaon players
Ligue 2 players
Championnat National players
Championnat National 2 players
Championnat National 3 players